Clelandina is an extinct genus of rubidgeine gorgonopsian from the Late Permian of Cistecephalus Assemblage Zone of South Africa. It was first named by Broom in 1948. The type and only species is C. rubidgei. It is relatively rare, with only four known specimens.

Description
Clelandina rubidgei has an extraordinarily small sclerotic ring relative to the size of its orbit, which implies that it was diurnal. It is the only rubidgeine with a preserved sclerotic ring, so it is unknown whether this trait was shared by other members of the subfamily. Like all rubidgeines, it was relatively large, with a skull up to 36 cm long. It had reduced dentition, with the teeth posterior to the canines being absent and replaced with a bony ridge. The skull has heavily pachyostosed, with massive rugose bosses.

Classification
Clelandina shares many characteristics with the contemporary Rubidgea, and is currently recognized as the sister taxon of this genus. Together with Dinogorgon and Leontosaurus, these genera form Rubidgeini, a clade of large gorgonopsians with distinctively robust, broad, and pachyostosed skulls.

Below is a cladogram recovered by Christian Kammerer in 2016.

See also
 List of therapsids

References

Further reading
paleodb.org
www.paleofile.com Alphabetical list - C section.
The Origin and Evolution of Mammals by Tom Kemp. Published 2005, Oxford University Press. 

Gorgonopsia
Prehistoric therapsid genera
Wuchiapingian
Permian synapsids of Africa
Fossils of South Africa
Fossil taxa described in 1948
Taxa named by Robert Broom